Sapindus marginatus, the Florida soapberry, is native to Georgia, Florida and South Carolina. It has pale gray or brown, ridged bark. The leaves are up to  foot long with 6 to 13 leaflets. The leaflets may be opposite or alternate. The leaves fall in the early spring.

Florida soapberry is similar to tropical soapberry (Sapindus saponaria). Some botanists consider Florida soapberry to be the same species as tropical soapberry.

References

marginatus
Trees of the Southeastern United States